Ermes di Colloredo (28 March 1622 – 21 September 1692) was an Italian count and writer who served the Grand Duke of Tuscany the Holy Roman Emperor and the Republic of Venice.

Ermes was born in Colloredo di Monte Albano, Friaul. He was educated at Medici's court in Florence as page of Greatduke Ferdinando II de' Medici, and entered the service of Emperor Ferdinand III during the Thirty Years War as a Cuirassiers' Officier, at the orders of his uncle, Field Marschall Rudolf von Colloredo Mels und Wallsee, Governor of Prague, of the Republic of Venice as a Cavalry Colonel and Emperor Leopold I. In the latter part of his life Ermes returned to his homeland to focus on writing poetry, most of which centers on the theme of love.

Ermes wrote over 200 sonnets, in both Friulian and Italian. He used the koinè from San Daniele, which would become the most notable literary language and the basis of today's standard Friulian.

Ermes died in Gurizzo, Codroipo.

See also
Friulian literature

Further reading
"Ermes di Colloredo: Poesie Friulane, l’Opera Completa".  LiteraryJoint Press, Philadelphia, PA, 2019. The complete work of Ermes Earl of Colloredo, full text.

External links
Sonets dal sît Centri Friûl Lenghe 2000 (Friulian) 
Lis poesiis (Friulian)
Altris poesiis (Friulian)

1622 births
1692 deaths
People from Colloredo di Monte Albano
17th-century Italian poets
Italian male poets
Friulian-language writers
Friulian-language poets
17th-century Italian male writers